Monohardi Govt Pilot Model High School (MGPMHS) is a public school located in Monohardi Upazila, Narsingdi, Bangladesh.

History
The school was established in 1948 in then East Pakistan now Bangladesh and follows the Secondary School Certificate (SSC) curriculum in Bengali medium. Now, this is the most reputed high school in Monohardi Upazila.

Structure
The school enrolls students from class (grade) 6 to 10. The school operates in one shift. Every year more than 200 students appear in the SSC and JSC examination, with about two-fourth in science group, and one-fourth in commerce group and the rest in arts group. According to school's official website there are about 1600 students and 44 teachers and stuffs in this school.

References

External links
 MPHS Website
 Education Board

Schools in Narsingdi District
High schools in Bangladesh
Educational institutions established in 1948
1948 establishments in East Pakistan